UFC 54: Boiling Point was a mixed martial arts event held by the Ultimate Fighting Championship on August 20, 2005, at the MGM Grand Arena in Las Vegas, Nevada. The event was broadcast live on pay-per-view in the United States, and later released on DVD.

History
A UFC Light Heavyweight Championship bout between reigning champion Chuck Liddell and Jeremy Horn served as the event’s headliner.

Results

See also 
 Ultimate Fighting Championship
 List of UFC champions
 List of UFC events
 2005 in UFC

References

Sources
UFC 54: Boiling Point Results on Sherdog.com
"Ultimate Fighting Championship Cards" on Wrestling Information Archives
UFC 54 Fighter Salaries

Ultimate Fighting Championship events
2005 in mixed martial arts
Mixed martial arts in Las Vegas
2005 in sports in Nevada
MGM Grand Garden Arena